Endeavour Sports High School (abbreviated as ESHS) is a government-funded co-educational comprehensive and specialist secondary day school, with speciality in sports, located in Caringbah, a southern suburb of Sydney, New South Wales, Australia.

Established in 1964 as Endeavour High School, the school caters to approximately 1,000 students from Year 7 to Year 12. It is a selective, comprehensive co-educational school which bases its enrolment on students being proficient in a targeted sport or living in the relatively small local catchment area of the school. The school is operated by the New South Wales Department of Education; the principal is James Kozlowski.

Endeavour Sports High School is a member of the NSW Sports High Schools Association. The school's alumni include many former and current sportspeople, and Endeavour Sports High School is well regarded in its sporting development of its students.

History
The school was established in 1964, and became a designated sports school in 1997.

Talented Sports Program 
Sports offered at Endeavour Sports High School include athletics, Australian rules football, gymnastics, baseball, basketball, cheerleading, cricket, dance,  hockey, netball, rugby league, rugby union, softball,  swimming, soccer, tennis.

Notable alumni

Rugby league
 Blake Ayshford
 Reece Blayney
 Fa'amanu Brown
 Mitch Brown
 Jess Caine
 Tony Caine
 Warren Carney
 Beau Champion
 Anthony Cherrington
 Damien Cook
 Cameron Cullen
 Andrew Dallalana
 Kurt Dillon
 Daniel Fepuleai
 Blake Ferguson
 Bryson Goodwin
 Isaac Gordon
 Jamayne Isaako
 Alex Johnston
 Adam Keighran
 William Kennedy Jr
 Cameron King
 Shaun Lane
 Joseph Leilua
 Luciano Leilua
 Rhys Lovegrove
 Billy Magoulias
 Penani Manumalealii
 Paul Momirovski
 Peewee Moke
 Kevin Naiqama
 Rory O'Brien
 John Olive
 Mosese Pangai
 Frank Pele
 Justin Poore
 Reece Robson
 Barry Russell 
 Scott Sorensen
 Curtis Scott
 Chase Stanley
 Kyle Stanley
 Brad Takairangi
 Martin Taupau
 Frank Winterstein
 Dean Whare
 Reece Williams
 Teig Wilton
 Bronson Xerri

Soccer
 Ben Folami
 Aleksandar Jovanović
 Tomi Juric
 Themba Muata-Marlow
 Michael Neill
 Teresa Polias
 Nikolas Tsattalios
 Marc Warren

Rugby union
 Luke Hume
 Brackin Karauria-Henry
 Brandon Paenga-Amosa
 De Wet Roos
 Ben Volavola
 Sera Naiqama

Swimmer
 Mitchell Kilduff
 Simon Cowley
 Amanda Reid
 Craig Stevens

Basketball
 Kate Gaze
 Ashleigh Karaitiana

Others

 James Bell, AFL player
 Moises Henriques, cricket player
 Sarah Kemp, golfer
 Abbey McCulloch, netball player
 Kaarle McCulloch, cyclist 
 Stacey McManus, softball player
  George Kambosos, boxer

See also 

 List of government schools in New South Wales
 Selective school (New South Wales)
 Education in Australia

References

Public high schools in Sydney
Educational institutions established in 1964
1964 establishments in Australia
Sutherland Shire
Selective schools in New South Wales
Sports schools in Australia